Player's Option: Skills & Powers (abbreviated SP, or S&P) is a supplemental sourcebook to the core rules of the second edition of the Advanced Dungeons & Dragons fantasy role-playing game.

Contents
Skills & Powers presents a new set of rules that further fleshes out character abilities, bringing these abilities together into a number of groups and giving them "character point" values. Players "buy" abilities for their characters, assuming that the character has the required number of points and that the group to which an ability belongs is available to the class and race of that character. For example, a player could choose not to take an ability standard to the character's class in favor of spending points on a proficiency, or the traditional limitations of a class could be overcome by spending points. Skills & Powers presents several new ways of rolling a character's six ability score statistics, and then provides extra rules to enable the player to alter them. Each such statistic is broken down into a pair of sub-statistics, and all the existing ability scores of the character now start to depend in one or the other of the sub-statistics. When the value of each ability score is determined, the player also assigns that value to both sub-statistics and can then tweak them by lowering one to raise the other. The book contains options to further focus a character's abilities and background.  One table is used to determine what event sent a character into the world to adventure, and there is a collection of different "character kits" that a player can use to determine social rank and to influence abilities. Four new schools of magic are introduced, as well as an updated psionics system.

The book begins with a one-page foreword by Niles and Donovan. Chapter One (pages 6–11) describes the character points system for Player's Option, which are used to improve the abilities of player characters. Chapter Two (pages 12–21) describes ability scores, each of which is divided into two subabilities. Chapter Three (pages 22–45) describes the racial requirements for each character race. Chapter Four (pages 46–63) presents details on how the various character classes work in the Player's Option system. Chapter Five (pages 64–85) provides 30 character kits, various character packages. Chapter Six (pages 86–111) details how nonweapon proficiencies work in play. Chapter Seven (pages 112-135) details weapon proficiency and mastery. Chapter Eight (pages 136-141) provides five new schools of magic. Chapter Nine (pages 142-175) details psionics in the Player's Option system. An appendix (pages 178-187) compiles the tables presented in this book. Pages 188-192 are an index to the book.

Publication history
This 192-page book was published by TSR, Inc. in 1995. The book was designed by Douglas Niles and Dale Donovan. Cover art is by Jeff Easley and interior art is by Thomas Baxa, Doug Chaffee, Les Dorscheid, Jeff Easley, Ken Frank, and Eric Hotz.

The psionics system from this book is later used in Dark Sun Campaign Setting, Expanded and Revised.

Reception
Cliff Ramshaw reviewed Player's Option: Skills & Powers for Arcane magazine, rating it a 9 out of 10 overall. He felt that readers might suspect that Skills & Powers would "do nothing but further confuse the situation" regarding the "out of hand" number of character classes available in the game, but suggested that the book "in fact does the opposite". According to Ramshaw, "When you start to use this system, you realise it's superb. Character abilities are still largely determined by the luck of the dice, and yet players are able to gain much more control over which abilities they wish to favour. And all without upsetting the tried and tested balance of the AD&D stats system." Ramshaw admits that character creation is "much more complex and time-consuming with these new rules but if, like me, you enjoy creating characters, then this will be a bonus rather than a problem" and that "the result is much greater player choice without letting characters get grossly out of hand. And once the character has been generated, it's no more difficult to play or referee than a character of the old school." Ramshaw concludes that "Although Skills & Powers will appeal particularly to players who'd like their characters to take on the abilities of specific heroes from literature, anyone who wants to make their characters stand out from the crowd will simply love it."

Reviews
Backstab #9

Further reading
 "Harrowed Heroes", Dragon #264
 "Designer Demesnes", Dragon #259
 "Heroes of Cerilla", Dragon #247
 "Heroes of Faith", Dragon #236
 "Mindscapes of Athas and Beyond", Dragon Annual #2
 "Planar Heroes", Dragon #235
 "Sage Advice", Dragon #233
 "Sage Advice", Dragon #231
 "Skills & Powers in Eight Easy Stages", Dragon #225

References

Dungeons & Dragons sourcebooks
Role-playing game supplements introduced in 1995